Theodorus Gaza (Theodoros Gazis;), also called Theodore Gazis or by the epithet Thessalonicensis (in Latin) and Thessalonikeus (in Greek)  (c. 1398 – c. 1475), was a Greek humanist and translator of Aristotle, one of the Greek scholars who were the leaders of the revival of learning in the 15th century (the Palaeologan Renaissance).

Life
Theodorus Gaza was born a Greek in an illustrious family in Thessaloniki, Macedonia in about c. 1400 when the city was under its first period of Turkish rule (it was restored to Byzantine rule in 1403). On the final capture of his native city by the Turks in 1430 he escaped to Italy. In December 1440 he was in Pavia, where he became acquainted  with Iacopo da San Cassiano, who introduced him to his master Vittorino da Feltre. During a three years' residence in Mantua where Vittorino held the celebrated humanistic school "La Giocosa", he rapidly acquired a competent knowledge of Latin under his teaching, supporting himself meanwhile by giving lessons in Greek, and by copying manuscripts of the ancient classics.

In 1447 he became professor of Greek in the newly founded University of Ferrara, to which students in great numbers from all parts of Italy were soon attracted by his fame as a teacher. His students there included Rodolphus Agricola. He had taken some part in the councils which were held in Siena (1423), Ferrara (1438), and Florence (1439), with the object of bringing about a reconciliation between the Greek and Latin Churches; and in 1450, at the invitation of Pope Nicholas V, he went to Rome, where he was for some years employed by his patron in making Latin translations from Aristotle and other Greek authors. In Rome, he continued his teaching activities: it was reported that on one occasion Pope Sixtus IV commissioned Gaza to translate Aristotle's works into Latin, with the pay of a number of gold pieces; however on receiving the pay Gaza was insulted at the amount paid, and furiously cast the money into the Tiber river. Amongst his students were fellow Byzantine Greeks Demetrius Chalcondyles, a leading scholar of the Renaissance period and Andronicus Callistus, a cousin of Theodore Gaza's.

After the death of Nicholas (1455), being unable to make a living at Rome, Gaza removed to Naples, where he enjoyed the patronage of Alphonso the Magnanimous for two years (1456–1458). Shortly afterwards he was appointed by Cardinal Bessarion to a benefice in Calabria, where the later years of his life were spent, and where he died about 1475 and was buried in the Basilian monastery of San Giovanni a Piro. After Gaza's death he was remembered by renaissance writers and praised for his skills; a letter written to Pope Sixtus IV by Ermolao Barbaro in 1480 includes a detailed appraisal of Gaza's translating abilities:

In the campaign waged by Plethon against Aristotelianism he contributed his share to the defence. His influence on humanists was considerable, in the success with which he taught Greek language and literature. At Ferrara he founded an academy to offset the influence of the Platonic academy founded by Plethon at Florence.

Works
His translations were superior, both in accuracy and style, to the versions in use before his time. He devoted particular attention to the translation and exposition of Aristotle's works on natural science.

Gaza stood high in the opinion of most of his learned contemporaries, but still higher in that of the scholars of the succeeding generation. His Greek grammar (in four books), written in Greek, first printed at Venice in 1495, and afterwards partially translated by Erasmus in 1521, although in many respects defective, especially in its syntax, was for a long time the leading textbook. His translations into Latin were very numerous, including:

Problemata, De partibus animalium and De generatione animalium of Aristotle
the Historia Plantarum of Theophrastus
the Problemata of Alexander of Aphrodisias
the De instruendis aciebus of Aelian
the De compositione verborum of Dionysius of Halicarnassus
some of the Homilies of John Chrysostom.

He also turned into Greek Cicero's De senectute and Somnium Scipionis with much success, in the opinion of Erasmus; with more elegance than exactitude, according to the colder judgment of modern scholars. He was the author also of two small treatises entitled De mensibus and De origine Turcarum.

The flowering plant Gazania, of southern Africa, is named after him.

See also
Byzantine scholars in Renaissance
List of Macedonians (Greek)

Notes

References
For a complete list of Gaza's works, see Fabricius, Bibliotheca Graeca (ed. Harles), x.

 Nancy Bisaha, Creating East and West: Renaissance humanists and the Ottoman Turks, University of Pennsylvania Press, 2006. 
 Deno J. Geanakoplos, `Theodore Gaza, a Byzantine scholar of the Palaeologan "renaissance" in the Italian Renaissance', Medievalia et Humanistica 12 (1984), 61-81 and in *Deno J. Geanakoplos, 'Theodore Gaza: a Byzantine Scholar of the Palaeologan "Renaissance" in the early Italian Renaissance, c. 1400-1475', in Geanakoplos, Constantinople and the West, University of Wisconsin Press, 1989, pp. 68–90. 
Jonathan Harris, 'Byzantines in Renaissance Italy', in Online Reference Book for Medieval Studies – 
 Jonathan Harris, Greek Émigrés in the West, 1400-1520, Porphyrogenitus, Camberley UK, 1995. 
 Fotis Vassileiou & Barbara Saribalidou, Short Biographical Lexicon of Byzantine Academics Immigrants in Western Europe, 2007.
 N.G. Wilson, From Byzantium to Italy. Greek Studies in the Italian Renaissance (London, 1992). 

Attribution

External links
 De natura animalium libri novem; De partibus animalium libri quattuor; De generatione animalium libri quinque (1492) - digital facsimile of Theodoros's translation of Aristotle, available from Linda Hall Library
 
 Θεοδώρου Γραμματικῆς Βιβλία Δʹ, the 1526 Florence edition of his grammar, on Google Books.

1400 births
1475 deaths
Byzantine grammarians
Greek educators
Greek Eastern Catholics
Greek translators
Greek–Latin translators
Latin–Greek translators
Greek Renaissance humanists
Thessalonian Renaissance humanists
15th-century Byzantine people
15th-century writers
15th-century Greek people
15th-century Byzantine writers
15th-century Greek writers
15th-century Greek educators
Greek Latinists